Elanne Starlight is a 2016 Chinese romantic drama film directed by Wang Ziqi and starring Elanne Kong, Lu Yulin, Ye Xinchen, Chen Zeyu, Joe Ma, Anne Heung and Sze Yu. It was released in China by Pearl River Pictures on August 26, 2016.

Plot

Cast
Elanne Kong
Lu Yulin
Ye Xinchen
Chen Zeyu
Joe Ma
Anne Heung
Sze Yu
Zhong Kai
Wu Jinxi

Reception
The film grossed  at the Chinese box office.

References

Chinese romantic drama films
2016 romantic drama films
2010s Mandarin-language films